African Zion Baptist Church is a historic Baptist church at 4104 Malden Drive in Malden, Kanawha County, West Virginia.  It is within the Malden Historic District.

It is a one-story frame structure built atop a stone foundation.  It has a gable roof topped by a wooden bell tower.  This is considered the mother church of African-American Baptists in West Virginia, many of whom migrated there after the American Civil War and Reconstruction. Among its noted members were "Father" Lewis Rice, founder of the church and a leader of the early African-American community in the Kanawha Valley of West Virginia, and Booker T. Washington.

It was listed on the National Register of Historic Places in 1974.

References

External links

e-WV, The West Virginia Encyclopedia: African Zion Baptist Church article

African-American history of West Virginia
Baptist churches in West Virginia
Churches in Kanawha County, West Virginia
National Register of Historic Places in Kanawha County, West Virginia
Churches on the National Register of Historic Places in West Virginia
Historic American Buildings Survey in West Virginia
Churches completed in 1872
Individually listed contributing properties to historic districts on the National Register in West Virginia
Wooden churches in West Virginia